Constance Spry  (née Fletcher, previously Marr; 5 December 1886 – 3 January 1960) was a British educator, florist and author in the mid-20th century.

Life 
Constance Fletcher was born in Derby in 1886, eldest child and only daughter of George and Henrietta Maria (née Dutton) Fletcher. After studying hygiene, physiology and district nursing in Ireland, she lectured on first aid and home care for the Irish Women's National Health Association. She married James Heppell Marr in 1910 and moved to Coolbawn, near Castlecomer. In 1912, their son Anthony Heppel Marr was born.

World War I had a profound impact on Constance Marr, and the Fletcher family. After the beginning of the war in 1914, Constance Marr was appointed secretary of the Dublin Red Cross. In 1916, she left both Ireland and her husband, escaping a violent marriage, and moved to Barrow-in-Furness with her son Anthony to work as a welfare supervisor. In 1917, she joined the civil service as the head of women's staff (welfare and medical treatment) at the Ministry of Aircraft Production. The same year, two of her brothers - Lieutenant Arnold Lockhart Fletcher and Second Lieutenant Donald Lockhart Fletcher - were killed in action, on 30 and 28 April 1917 respectively. After these losses, her mother didn't speak for two years.

In 1921, she was appointed headmistress of the Homerton and South Hackney Day Continuation School in Homerton, east London, where she instructed teenage factory workers in cookery and dressmaking, and later flower arranging. In 1926, she married her second husband Henry Ernest Spry.

Spry gave up teaching in 1928, to open her first shop, "Flower Decoration", in 1929. After securing a regular order from Granada Cinemas, she caused a sensation in fashionable society by creating an exquisite arrangement of hedgerow flowers in the windows of Atkinsons, an Old Bond Street perfumery in central London as part of the decoration undertaken by the theatrical designer Norman Wilkinson. Spry ransacked attics for unusual objects to use as containers and drew inspiration from the Dutch 17th- and 18th-century flower painters, while she popularized unusual plant materials to offset flowers, like pussy willow, weeds and grasses and ornamental kale.

When she opened a larger shop in South Audley Street in Mayfair in 1934, Spry was already employing seventy people. In the same year, she published her first book, Flower Decoration, and established the "Constance Spry Flower School" at her new premises.

The biographer Diana Souhami revealed the painter Gluck had a romantic relationship with Spry, whose work informed the artist's admired floral paintings. In 2012 English Heritage marked Spry's tenure at 64 South Audley Street with a blue plaque.

In 1936, "Flower Decoration" created the flower arrangements for the royal weddings of the Duke of Gloucester to Lady Alice Christabel Montagu-Douglas-Scott and the more private wedding of the Duke and Duchess of Windsor in June 1937. Public interest from these commissions led to two tours of the US. 

When World War II began in 1939, Spry resumed her teaching career and lectured to women all over Britain. In 1942, she published Come into The Garden, Cook, based around French cuisine, hoping to help the war effort by encouraging the British to grow and eat their own food. Her company continued to provide floral decorations at weddings.

In 1946, she opened a domestic science school with her friend, the accomplished Le Cordon Bleu cook Rosemary Hume, at Winkfield Place, at Cranbourne in Winkfield, Berkshire. Constance lived at Orchard Lea, across the road, and then over the stable block at the Place. In 1953, Spry was commissioned to arrange the flowers at Westminster Abbey and along the processional route from Buckingham Palace for Queen Elizabeth II's coronation. The flowers were supplied as gifts by Commonwealth nations. The Le Cordon Bleu students at Winkfield were asked to cater a lunch for foreign delegates for whom Hume and Spry invented a new dish – coronation chicken.

She was appointed an OBE in the 1953 Coronation Honours.

At Winkfield Place, Spry devoted years to the cultivation of particular varieties of antique roses, which she was instrumental in bringing back into fashion; David Austin's first rose introduction, in 1961, was named after her and is considered to be the foundation of his "English rose" series. 

In 1956, she and Hume published the best-selling Constance Spry Cookery Book, thereby extending the Spry style from flowers to food. On 3 January 1960, she slipped on the stairs at Winkfield Place and died an hour later. Her last words were supposedly, "Someone else can arrange this".

Legacy

Spry's books remained in print for many years after her death and her floristry business thrived until the early 2000s. Her personal papers and records are in the RHS Lindley Library. Constance Spry's influence in floristry remains strong in the modern era. Luxury florist Nikki Pierce has cited her as an inspiration as did Patricia Easterbrook Roberts. The floral designer Shane Connolly was guest curator of an exhibition in 2021 at the Garden Museum, London, of Spry's achievements and life. This made use of the extensive materials from the Lindley Library archives.

Bibliography 
Constance Spry, Flower Decoration. Dent, 1934
Constance Spry, Flowers in House and Garden. Dent, 1937
Constance Spry, Garden Notebook. Dent, 1940
Constance Spry: Come into the Garden, Cook. Dent 1942
Constance Spry, Summer and Autumn. Dent, 1951
Constance Spry, Winter and Spring Flowers. Dent, 1951
Constance Spry, How to do the Flowers, Dent, 1952, 1953
Constance Spry, A Constance Spry Anthology. Dent, 1953
Constance Spry, Party Flowers. Dent, 1955
Constance Spry and Rosemary Hume, The Constance Spry Cookery Book. Dent, 1956
Constance Spry, Simple Flowers 'A millionaire for a few pence'''. Dent, 1957
Constance Spry, Favourite Flowers, Dent. 1959
Constance Spry and Rosemary Hume, Hostess. Dent, 1961

Notes

 References 

Elizabeth Coxhead, Constance Spry: A Biography, W. Luscombe, 1975
Mary Rensten, Knowing Constance Spry, Samuel French, 2004
Sue Shephard, The Surprising Life of Constance Spry: From Social Reformer to Society Florist'', Pan MacMillan, 2011

1886 births
1960 deaths
English women writers
Heads of schools in England
Florists
Officers of the Order of the British Empire
People from Derby
People from Winkfield
People from Barrow-in-Furness
British women in World War I
Schoolteachers from Derbyshire
Civil servants in the Ministry of Aircraft Production